The Remington Model 572 Fieldmaster is a manually-operated, slide-action rimfire repeating rifle manufactured by the Remington Arms Company. The 572 is noted for its similarity to the Remington 870 shotgun in design. The 572 is chambered for the .22 Short, .22 Long and .22 Long Rifle cartridges. Ammunition is supplied by a tubular magazine under the barrel which holds 15-22 rounds depending on the cartridge used.  The longevity of manufacture speaks well of the popularity and durability of the action, and the overall reliability of this gun.  It is popular with "plinkers" and collectors both, along with being a good small game, or "camp" rifle.

History and design
The Remington 572 was introduced in 1954 as a successor to the Remington Model 121 as the M572A having the look and feel of the Remington 870 shotgun. Weighing in at 5 lbs., the rifle is a "hammerless" style, meaning the hammer is contained within the action and ejection is through the side.  This allows the top of the receiver to be grooved for scope mounting and keeps spent brass from hitting the shooter's face.

A lightweight version known as the Remington Model 572 Fieldmaster was introduced in 1957. Remington was able to shave 1 pound from the total weight of the M572A by using aluminium to manufacture the receiver, trigger guard, buttplate, and barrel (although the barrel incorporated a steel insert).  With its sungrain walnut stock and forend on the M572 and M572 Fieldmaster; the rifle was available in three other color schemes: "Crow-wing Black"(CWB), "Buckskin Tan"(BT), and "Teal-wing Blue"(TWB).  These abbreviations served as a suffix to the model number.  The M572TWB was discontinued in 1960 and the M572BT and M572CWB were last offered in 1962.  

In 1966, Remington introduced the BDL or "Deluxe" rifle to supplement the 572A and 572SB. The BDL featured a ramp front sight with gold bead, a fully adjustable rear sight modeled after the sight used on Remington 700 big-game rifle, and a higher-grade walnut forearm and straight-comb butt stock with impressed checkering. In 1991, the walnut butt stock of the BDL Deluxe version was altered to incorporate a Monte Carlo comb to improve cheek weld when using the rifle with a telescopic sight, and the impressed checkering was altered to machine-cut checkering.

Current Production Rifles
In 2017, after complaints that the Monte Carlo comb made the rifle difficult to use with open sights, Remington returned to a straight comb stock design for current production BDL rifles.  The BDL is the only 572 model currently in production.

References

External links
 - Remington's information page on the Model 572 BDL Fieldmaster

Remington Arms firearms
Pump-action rifles
Rifles of the United States
.22 LR rifles